Swinley Forest Golf Club is a golf club located in Swinley Forest off Coronation Road, three miles southwest of Ascot, Berkshire, England. It was established in 1909. Colt routed the course over gently undulating heathland.

Most golf courses in the United Kingdom welcome some type of guest play. However, Swinley Forest remains one of the most private golf clubs in the United Kingdom.

References

Golf clubs and courses in Berkshire
1909 establishments in England
Winkfield